Éric Bonneval (born 12 November 1963 in Toulouse) is a former French rugby union player. He played as a Centre.

Eric Bonneval played for Stade Toulousain and Racing Club de France. His usual positions was Centre, although he started his career in France national rugby union team as a Wing. He earned his first national cap on 23 June 1984 against New Zealand at Auckland. He was called up for the 1987 Rugby World Cup, where France were runners-up to New Zealand.

Honours 
 French rugby champion, 1985, 1986 with Stade Toulousain
 Challenge Yves du Manoir, 1988 with Stade Toulousain

References

External links 
 

1963 births
Living people
French rugby union players
Stade Toulousain players
France international rugby union players
Rugby union centres
Rugby union players from Toulouse
US Colomiers players
Racing 92 players